Álvaro Daniel Pereira Barragán (born 28 November 1985) is a Uruguayan former footballer.

After starting out at Miramar Misiones he went on to play for a host of clubs in several countries, mainly Porto and Inter Milan, winning eight major titles with the former while appearing in 118 competitive matches (three goals).

A Uruguay international since 2008, Pereira represented his country in two World Cups and three Copa Américas, earning 83 caps and winning the 2011 edition of the latter tournament.

Club career

Early years
Born in Montevideo, Pereira began his career with Miramar Misiones in 2003, moving to Argentina with Quilmes Atlético Club two years later. After the latter's relegation from the Primera División at the end of the 2006–07 season he joined Argentinos Juniors, finishing as the team's top goalscorer in the 2007 Apertura.

In the middle of 2008, Pereira signed with Romania's CFR Cluj for a €2.5 million fee. He started in all the club's matches in its debut campaign in the UEFA Champions League.

Porto

Pereira joined FC Porto on 4 June 2009 for a reported €4.5 million, with the Portuguese acquiring 80% of the player's rights. In his first year he mostly operated as a left back, as the northerners finished third and won the Taça de Portugal. He scored his first goal for the club on 21 February 2010, netting the second in a 5–1 home thrashing of S.C. Braga.

In Pereira's second season at the Estádio do Dragão, he featured in 21 Primeira Liga games (all starts), adding 12 UEFA Europa League appearances as Porto won the treble. He also started in the campaign's Portuguese Cup final against Vitória de Guimarães on 22 May 2011, scoring an own goal in the 21st minute to bring the sides level, in an eventual 6–2 triumph.

After Porto rejected an offer from Premier League side Chelsea in the summer for Pereira, he signed a new contract on 3 October 2011 running until 2016, with his release clause remaining at £25.7 million. In late December, he heavily criticised Manchester United's Patrice Evra for reporting alleged racist abuse from Pereira's national team colleague Luis Suárez – including a claim from Evra that Suárez "doesn't speak to black players" – saying that "what happens on the pitch stays on the pitch", adding that the Frenchman would have to "wear body armour" if the players' future international friendly was to take place immediately instead of in late 2012.

Inter Milan
Pereira signed for Inter Milan in late August 2012 for €10 million on a four-year contract, reuniting with former Porto teammate Fredy Guarín. He made his Serie A debut on 2 September in a 1–3 home loss against A.S. Roma, and finished his first season with 40 appearances all competitions comprised, scoring his only goal in a 2–0 league victory at A.C. ChievoVerona.

On 17 January 2014, São Paulo FC signed Pereira on loan for one and a half years, with an option to make the move permanent. He played his first match with his new club nine days later, a 2–1 win against Oeste Futebol Clube for that year's Campeonato Paulista, assisting Antônio Carlos in the second goal; after the match, he stated he "...liked the team's intensity", further adding he still needed to "...improve a lot."

Estudiantes
In January 2015, Pereira returned to Argentina to join Estudiantes de La Plata in a temporary deal, with an obligation to sign for €2.752 million. He appeared in 36 matches across all competitions in his first year, scoring three goals – including one in a 1–1 draw with San Martín de San Juan in the Copa Argentina which Estudiantes won after a penalty shoot-out. However, in his last appearance, an exhibition game against neighbouring Club de Gimnasia y Esgrima La Plata which eventually turned into a massive brawl, he assaulted opponent Facundo Oreja with a kick to the face which saw him sent off; he was eventually handed an eight-match ban, which he served at his following club Getafe CF, where he arrived in February 2016 on loan until June.

Pereira played his first match for the Spaniards on 1 March 2016, being ejected after two bookable offences midway through the second half of a 0–4 defeat at UD Las Palmas.

Late career
On 3 July 2016, Pereira signed a one-year loan contract with Cerro Porteño of the Paraguayan Primera División. During his spell in Barrio Obrero, he dealt with several injury problems.

Pereira returned to his country's and its Primera División in late January 2019, with the 33-year-old joining Club Nacional de Football still on loan from Estudiantes. On his debut on 4 February, he was sent off for a second yellow card at the end of extra time as the club won the Supercopa Uruguaya on penalties against rivals Peñarol.

Having played only eight competitive games during his tenure, Pereira became a free agent and returned to Paraguay, signing for Club Atlético River Plate (Asunción) in January 2020. On 7 October that year he came back to Europe, by joining ŠKF Sereď in the Slovak Super Liga. He only completed some seven minutes for Sereď against FC ViOn Zlaté Moravce, before contracting COVID-19. He departed from the club in December after some two months.

International career
Pereira made his debut for Uruguay against France, on 19 November 2008. He scored his first international goal in his next match, another friendly, with Libya in Tripoli (3–2 win).

Pereira was an undisputed starter for the nation during the second half of the 2010 FIFA World Cup qualifiers, also starting in both legs of the successful playoffs against Costa Rica as the Charrúas returned to the FIFA World Cup. In the finals in South Africa he played in all the matches except two, scoring through a rare header in a 3–0 group stage victory over the hosts.

Pereira was selected to the 2011 Copa América in Argentina, being first-choice and scoring two goals in the group stage, including the game's only against Mexico as Uruguay won its 15th continental tournament. In 2013, he represented La Celeste at the 2013 FIFA Confederations Cup as the nation reached the semi-finals, and also participated in the team's successful World Cup qualifying campaign.

On 2 June 2014, Pereira was named in Uruguay's squad for the 2014 World Cup finals. On 19 June, in the second group game against England, he was struck unconscious after being kneed in the head by Raheem Sterling, but refused to be replaced after recovering and went on to feature the full 90 minutes in the 2–1 win.

At the 2015 Copa América in Chile, Pereira was suspended for the quarter-final against the hosts, and his team lost by a single goal. The following year, at the next edition in the United States, he only played the first group game, in which he scored an own goal in a 3–1 loss to Mexico.

On 17 November 2015 Pereira scored 2 goals to make the 4–0 win to Uruguay in the qualifiers

Career statistics

Club

International

International goals

Honours
CFR Cluj
Cupa României: 2008–09

Porto
Primeira Liga: 2010–11, 2011–12
Taça de Portugal: 2009–10, 2010–11
Supertaça Cândido de Oliveira: 2009, 2010
UEFA Europa League: 2010–11
Taça da Liga runner-up: 2009–10

Cerro Porteño
Paraguayan Primera División: 2017 Clausura

Nacional
Supercopa Uruguaya: 2019

Uruguay
Copa América: 2011

References

External links

Argentine League statistics at Fútbol XXI 

1985 births
Living people
Afro-Uruguayan
Footballers from Montevideo
Uruguayan footballers
Association football defenders
Association football midfielders
Uruguayan Primera División players
Miramar Misiones players
Club Nacional de Football players
Argentine Primera División players
Quilmes Atlético Club footballers
Argentinos Juniors footballers
Estudiantes de La Plata footballers
Liga I players
CFR Cluj players
Primeira Liga players
FC Porto players
Serie A players
Inter Milan players
Campeonato Brasileiro Série A players
São Paulo FC players
La Liga players
Getafe CF footballers
Paraguayan Primera División players
Cerro Porteño players
River Plate (Asunción) footballers
ŠKF Sereď players
Slovak Super Liga players
Estudiantes de Mérida players
Venezuelan Primera División players
UEFA Europa League winning players
Uruguay international footballers
2010 FIFA World Cup players
2011 Copa América players
2013 FIFA Confederations Cup players
2014 FIFA World Cup players
2015 Copa América players
Copa América Centenario players
Copa América-winning players
Uruguayan expatriate footballers
Expatriate footballers in Argentina
Expatriate footballers in Romania
Expatriate footballers in Portugal
Expatriate footballers in Italy
Expatriate footballers in Brazil
Expatriate footballers in Spain
Expatriate footballers in Paraguay
Expatriate footballers in Slovakia
Expatriate footballers in Venezuela
Uruguayan expatriate sportspeople in Argentina
Uruguayan expatriate sportspeople in Romania
Uruguayan expatriate sportspeople in Portugal
Uruguayan expatriate sportspeople in Italy
Uruguayan expatriate sportspeople in Brazil
Uruguayan expatriate sportspeople in Spain
Uruguayan expatriate sportspeople in Paraguay
Uruguayan expatriate sportspeople in Slovakia
Uruguayan expatriate sportspeople in Venezuela